James Nicholas Carleton Paget (born 16 February 1966) is Senior Lecturer in New Testament Studies in the Faculty of Divinity of the University of Cambridge. He is a Fellow and Tutor of Peterhouse, and was educated at Eton College and Queens' College, Cambridge. The son of John Byng Oswald Carleton Paget and Sheila Anne Lowther, his great-great-grandfather was Henry Alexander Carleton, and his great-uncle was John Luke Lowther.

Carleton Paget is co-editor of the Journal of Ecclesiastical History.


Works

Books
 - revised thesis

Edited by

References

Living people
New Testament scholars
Academic journal editors
Fellows of Peterhouse, Cambridge
Alumni of Queens' College, Cambridge
People educated at Eton College
Historians of Christianity
1966 births
British historians of religion